Imperial was the Chrysler Corporation's luxury automobile brand from 1955 to 1975, and again from 1981 to 1983.

The Imperial name had been used since 1926, as a Chrysler luxury model, the Chrysler Imperial. However, in 1955, the company spun off Imperial into its own make and division to better compete with its North American rivals, Lincoln and Cadillac. Imperial would see new or modified body styles introduced every two to three years, all with V8 engines and automatic transmissions, as well as technologies that would filter down to Chrysler Corporation's other models.

Background 

Originally, the Chrysler Imperial was introduced in 1926 as Chrysler's flagship vehicle for much of its history. It was based on extended-length platforms of the company's full-size cars and competed with the likes of rival Cadillac, Continental, Lincoln, Duesenberg, Pierce Arrow, Cord, and Packard.

Production started due to Walter P. Chrysler wanting a share of the luxury car market in the United States, and also expand the company's lineup since their most expensive car by that time only had a displacement of a six-cylinder engine to offer. The new model called the Imperial shared the same body as the cheaper Chrysler Six but had a slightly larger engine, being a 288.6 cu in (4.7 L). Subsequent generations were based on the Chrysler Royal, Airflow, Saratoga, and New Yorker.

In 1954 Chrysler dropped their brand name from the car and renamed it just the Imperial in an effort to better compete with other luxury manufacturers.
Lincoln would pull a similar move 2 years later when they made the Continental Division a standalone brand.

First generation (1955–1956): A separate make 

For the 1955 model year, the Imperial was launched and registered as a separate marque (make), apart from the Chrysler brand. It was a product of the new Imperial Division of Chrysler Corporation, meaning that the Imperial would be a make and division unto itself, and not bear the Chrysler name. Chrysler Corporation sent notices to all state licensing agencies in the then-48 states, informing them, that the Imperial, beginning in 1955, would no longer be registered as a Chrysler, but as a separate make . Chrysler introduced the "100 Million Look" Styling by Virgil Exner, who would define Imperial's look (and the look of cars from the other four Chrysler divisions) from 1955 to 1963.
Even as early as in 1954, Chrysler Corporation ads at the time began to visibly and consciously separate The Imperial from the Chrysler Division car line in the eyes of the public, to prepare for the big change coming in 1955. Once the "Imperial" brand was introduced, Cadillac no longer used the "Imperial" name for its top-level limousines starting in 1955.

Chrysler was also the supplier of engines and transmissions used in the Imperial with Paris, France automaker Facel Vega, which offered the Facel Vega Excellence, while Chinese automaker Hongqi used an Imperial locally found in China to manufacture the Hongqi CA72.

1955 

The 1955 models are said to be inspired by Exner's own 1952 Chrysler Imperial Parade Phaeton show cars (which were themselves later updated to match the 1955-56 Imperials). The platform and bodyshell were shared with that year's big Chryslers, but the Imperial had a wheelbase that was  longer, providing it with more rear-seat legroom, had a wide-spaced split egg-crate grille, the same as that used on the Chrysler 300 "executive hot rod", and had free-standing "gunsight" taillights mounted above the rear quarters, which were similar to those on the Exner's 1951 Chrysler K-310 concept car. Gunsight taillights were also known as "sparrow-strainer" taillights, named after the device used to keep birds out of jet engines. Such taillights were separated from the fender and surrounded by a ring and became an Imperial fixture through 1962, although they would only be free-standing in 1955-56 and again in 1961-62. Two "C-69" models were available, including the two-door Newport hardtop coupe (3,418 built) and pillared four-door sedan (7,840 built), along with an additional "C-70" Crown limousine model (172 built). The Newport nameplate was only used for 1955 and renamed the Southampton beginning in 1956. Power brakes and power steering were standard, along with Chrysler's "PowerFlite" automatic transmission. One major option on the 1955 and 1956 Imperials was air conditioning, at a cost of $535 ($ in  dollars ). Production totaled 11,430, more than twice the 1954 figure, positioning the Imperial as much more exclusive in comparison to more widely available and affordable Lincoln and Cadillac. Manufacturers list price for the Newport hardtop was $4,720 ($ in  dollars ) while the Imperial Crown limousine was $7,737 ($ in  dollars ).

1956 

The 1956 models were similar, but had small tailfins.

1956 was the year that Chrysler introduced the push button PowerFlite automatic transmission becoming available mid-year with the control pod installed to the left of the driver; Packard also introduced a similar system called the Touchbutton Ultramatic in the Imperial's competitor, the Packard Caribbean and the Patrician. For 1957, Mercury introduced its version called "Keyboard Control" for the Merc-O-Matic, which also included a pushbutton to place the transmission in neutral so the engine could be started and a push/pull control to set the parking brake and lock the transmission in gear. The Mercury and Chrysler versions were operated mechanically while the Packard and the controversial and short lived Edsel Teletouch version used electric solenoids to change gears.

On April 28, 1955, Chrysler and Philco announced the development and production of the world's first all-transistor car radio, the Mopar model 914HR. It was developed and produced by Chrysler and Philco and was a $150.00 "option" on the 1956 Imperial car models ($ in  dollars ). Philco manufactured the Mopar 914HR starting in the fall of 1955 at its Sandusky Ohio plant, for Chrysler.

Second generation (1957–1966) 

For the 1957 model year, the Imperial received its own platform, setting it apart from any other division of Chrysler and shared the all-new "Forward Look" appearance, showing many styling features introduced with the concept car Chrysler Norseman. Overall, this made the front end loosely resemble the smaller 1957 Plymouth Savoy. This would last through the 1966 model year. The front seat shoulder room measurement remains an unsurpassed record for Imperial and would remain the record for any car until the 1971–1976 GM full-size models. After Lincoln downsized for 1961, this generation of Imperial had no real competitor for the title of largest car for the remainder of its decade-long lifespan. The Imperial Crown convertible was listed at US$5,598 ($ in  dollars ) and 1,167 were manufactured.

Unlike the rest of the Chrysler Corporation makes (Chrysler, De Soto, Dodge, and Plymouth) that began unibody construction for 1960, the Imperial retained separate full perimeter frames for rigidity through the 1966 model year. These substantial frames had a box cross-section with strong crossmembers connecting the frame. The convertible had extra strength built into its crossmembers that formed an "X". The driveshaft passed through a hole in the "X" frame. The parking brake gripped the driveshaft and was not connected to the rear drum brakes prior to the 1963 model year.

The Imperial, and all Chrysler-built cars, incorporated "Torsion-Aire" suspension for 1957. This was an indirect-acting, torsion-bar front suspension system that reduced unsprung weight and shifted the car's center of gravity downward and rearward. Torsion-bar suspension on the front combined with multi-leaf springs on the rear provided a smoother ride and improved handling.

Imperial's handling was better than its competitors of the time due to its stiffness from the torsion-bars combined with a thick anti roll bar in the front. Pillarless hardtops, in both two and four-door configurations, received the Southampton designation.

The Imperial served as the basis for the Hongqi CA72 Chinese state limousine. In 1966 the car was modernized as the Hongqi CA770 however it used a 340 which was not available in the Imperial. The car continued production in various guises until the mid-1990s. After this, it was replaced by a range of licensed produced vehicles based on the Audi 100.

1957 (Series IMI-1,2,4) 

The 1957 model year was based on an even greater degree on Virgil Exner's "Forward Look" styling (also used on other full-size Chryslers of the period). It featured a "biplane" front bumper, a full-width egg-crate grille, and quad headlights (where legal). Taller tailfins now encompassed the trademark gunsight taillights and framed a downward tapering decklid that met the rear bumper. Curved side glass was employed for the first time in a U.S. production car. Power seats and dual exhaust were made standard across the line. A convertible was available for the first time on an Imperial and only offered in the mid-range Crown series. Sales were helped by Exner's "ahead of the competition" styling, with 1957 becoming the best-selling Imperial model year ever: 37,593 were produced; the more commonly available Cadillac sold over 120,000 cars in 1957. 

Cadillac was shocked by the new popular design from Chrysler. Cadillac retaliated by implementing training to its sales force to call Imperial a "Chrysler Imperial" to try to dampen the sales of its competitor. This tactic was to create the thought that you were buying an over priced Chrysler. 

Quality control also slipped considerably, a consequence of the second total redesign in two years. Failing torsion-bars that were made incorrectly was also a problem from being produced too quickly.

Starting in the 1957 model year, Imperials were available in three levels of trim: standard Imperial Custom, mid-range Imperial Crown, and the new top-of-the-line Imperial LeBaron  (a reference to LeBaron, Carrossiers). The custom-built  Imperial Crown limousine was also offered. Through the late 1950s and into the early 1960s styling would continue to become "Longer, Lower, Wider", with the addition of some of the wildest fins on a car. The "FliteSweep Deck Lid", a simulated Continental tire bulge, was an option for 1957 through 1961 and again in 1963 (due to demand). It was shared with contemporary Mopars, including the Valiant. Exner's design extended to early-fifties concept cars like the 1953 Chrysler D'Elegance.

1958 (Series LY1-L,M,H) 

Styling changes for 1958 were limited to the front grille and bumper. Quad headlights became standard. The 1958 Imperial is credited with the introduction of cruise control, which was called "Auto-Pilot", and was available on the Imperial, and on Chrysler New Yorker, 300, Saratoga and Windsor models. Power door locks were another new option. Sales slipped to 16,133 in a recession year. Dealers were frustrated with buyers referring to the cars as a "Chrysler Imperial", which impacted sales as Imperial was not seen as having Cadillac's or Lincoln's prestige. It didn't help that Imperial continued to be sold at Chrysler dealerships, instead of standalone dealers, although it did have a separate "Imperial" dealership sign.

1959 (Series MY1-L,M,H) 

Production was moved from the traditional Jefferson Avenue Assembly plant in Detroit to an exclusive facility on Warren Avenue, north of the Jefferson Avenue factory. Other than a toothy new grill and revisions to side trim little changed in terms of exterior styling for the 1959 model year. A new option was the "Silvercrest" roof which featured a stainless steel front with a rear canopy that could be ordered either in any of the basic car colors or in the "Landau" version which had a black canopy with the appearance of leather.

A new option was the swivel-out front seats that were separate from the standard six-way electric front bench seat. Manually activated by a handle for this introductory year, in 1960 the seats would automatically swivel when the front door was opened, activated by a cable and springs. This automatic feature was discontinued by Chrysler within a few months. Many assume this was for safety reasons due to the feature being dependent on the front doors opening, although the specific reason is not clearly documented. Swivel seats returned to manual operation for the rest of 1960 and all of 1961.

The Hemi V8 was replaced with the less expensive  "Wedge" head V8 engine that nevertheless had more horsepower and weighed 101 lbs less, improving the power-to-weight ratio. For the model year 17,710 Imperials were produced, ahead of Lincoln, as the Packard luxury brand withdrew from the marketplace. The few Ghia-built 1959 Imperial Crown limousines continued to use the 392 cubic-inch Hemi, due to slow production. These cars got the 413 engine for 1960.

The design of the 1960–1963 period had elicited some controversy. At that time, Exner was increasingly struggling with the Chrysler president and board. "It was during 1962 Exner was dethroned as president of design in Highland Park. His successor was Elwood Engel, lured away from Ford to lead Chrysler Corporation along a more conventional path. Exner continued as a consultant through 1964, after which he had no further involvement." This source also states, "When he was good, he was very good ( re: styling). When he was bad.... it was the epitome of excessive design. Sales dropped off and the board stepped in." Exner's son went on further, in a 1976 interview, "it was time for a change. Their image needed changing. Dad was a great designer and he was always ahead of his time. He gained more freedom from Chrysler in his designs of the modern Stutz." This same source gives accounts of how Chrysler Corporation was revived through corporate changes in leadership. "But on the product front, the influence of Tex Colbert (ousted President of Chrysler in 1961) and Virgil Exner was still present, and it wouldn't be entirely washed away until 1965".

Despite the annual styling changes, all 1960-63 models featured a similar space age dashboard. The steering wheel was squared-off at top and bottom, designed for better legroom and view through the windshield in the straight-ahead position. Dashboard lighting was electroluminescent, which used no incandescent lamps: electricity running through a five-layer laminate caused the phosphorescent ceramic layer to glow in the dark. Chrysler called it "Panelescent", and it was shared on some Chrysler models. The effect was eerie and surprisingly modern, with its glowing blue-green face and bright red needles. The 1960-63 models were also united by a distinctive side trim that started above the headlights and that ran at a slight downward angle almost to the end of the rear fender (except in 1963 when it would actually wrap all the way around the rear of the car) that was undercut by a slight indent in the sides from the front until just before the rear wheel housing.

A significant change in the car's proportions had occurred between the 1959 and 1960 model years. Although, at 226.3 inches, the 1960 Imperials were exactly the same length as the previous year, the whole body had been shifted forward, with a 2.1 inch reduction in the rear overhang, and a corresponding increase at the front.

1960 (Series PY1-L,M,H)

The 1960 Imperial adopted wildly exaggerated styling, featuring front fascia with a swooping bumper, gaping mesh grille, giant chrome eagle, and hooded quad headlights, and tall rear fins. Soaring fins had bullet-style tail lamps at the peak of the fin, with a chrome ring surrounding it. The grille and bumper on the front of the 1960 used large pieces of heavy chrome, and the 'furrowed brows' of the fenders over the double sets of headlights gave the car a ponderous look. In common with most other 1960 Chrysler products, the Imperial featured the new "High-Tower" seat with the driver-side back individually contoured and raised above of the rest of the front seat for increased driver comfort and shoulder support. This would last through the 1962 model year. Also for 1960, Imperial changed back to 15-inch wheels from the 14-inch wheels that had been standard since the 1957 model. Imperial LeBarons now featured a distinctive smaller "formal rear window" for greater rear-seat privacy. Sales increased to 17,719. Imperial again finished ahead of Lincoln, but never did so again. While the rest of Chrysler's lineup adopted unibody construction, Imperial retained its body on frame construction.

1961 (Series RY1-L,M,H) 

The 1961 model year brought a wholly new front end with free-standing headlights on short stalks in cut-away front 
fenders (a classical throwback favored by Virgil Exner, used commonly in the 1930s Chryslers. He would continue his look with the modern Stutz), and the largest tailfins ever. Inside, the Imperial gained an improved dash layout with an upright rectangular bank of gauges. The pillared four-door sedan was canceled and would not return until the 1967 model year. With the downsizing of Lincoln, at 227.1 inches (later increased to 227.8 inches in 1963), the Imperial would once again be the longest non-limousine car made in America through 1966. Sales fell to 12,258, the result of bizarre styling and continued poor quality control while the retail price for the LeBaron was US$6,428 ($ in  dollars ).

1962 (Series SY1-L,M,H) 

The tailfins were largely truncated in 1962, topped with free-standing gunsight taillights, but these were elongated and streamlined. The front grille was split, as in 1955-56, and a large round Eagle hood ornament was fitted for the first time. The 1962 models had a new, slimmer TorqueFlite A727 automatic transmission, which allowed a smaller transmission "hump" in the floor. This provided greater comfort for middle front-seat passengers. Dual exhaust were only standard on convertibles. 1962 also marked the closing of Imperial's dedicated assembly plant. All later Imperials were once again built in the same Jefferson Avenue facilities in Detroit as Chryslers, as sales were insufficient to maintain a separate facility. 1962 production totaled 14,337. Shortly before leaving Chrysler, Virgil Exner had planned for a smaller Imperial to go along with the downsized 1962 Mopars, but the idea never went anywhere.

1963 (Series TY1-L,M,H) 

The 1963 models saw the split grille disappear again, replaced by a cluster of chromed rectangles, and the taillights were now inside the rear fenders, in ordinary fashion, for the first time. In addition, the designers redesigned the rooflines of Custom and Crown, two and four-door models to be more squared off with thicker c pillars. 1963 models were the last Virgil Exner–styled Imperials, however Elwood Engel began applying some of his own touches to them, especially in the form of the redesigned base and Crown roofs. The LeBaron roofs remained the same with formal styling and closed in the rear window. 14,121 cars were produced for 1963.

In 1961, Chrysler scored a coup by hiring Engel away from Ford, where he had designed the 1961 Lincoln Continental. Engel's design themes at Chrysler were a major departure from the fins of Virgil Exner, and instead featured a more familiar three-box design, but with more extreme rectilinear styling. And, at first glance, the total re-styling of the Imperial in 1964 was thought to strongly resemble Elwood Engel’s previous efforts for the 1961 Lincoln Continental. Both cars shared clean, slab-sided body panels, thick C-pillars, and a chrome molding outlining the top of the fender line. However, Engel used subtle curves and parallelogram angles to give the Imperial a distinct and novel look.

1964 (Series VY1-M,H) 

The 1964 Imperials were the first designed entirely by Engel. Predictably, they bore a strong resemblance to the Lincoln Continental. The dashboards seemed more conventional because the squared-off steering wheel and electroluminescent dash lighting were gone, though the ribbon-style speedometer remained. A split grille returned after one year's absence, inspired by the 1955 model's appearance, and the faux spare tire bulge atop the trunk lid became squared-off and stylized. A central boss the fuel filler cap, covered with a large Imperial Eagle. Horizontal spear-shaped housings in the rear held a taillight and backup light. The defroster became standard for the windshield, optional was rear defroster. 

The base Imperial Custom model was dropped, with available body styles including a four-door hardtop offered in the Crown and LeBaron levels of trim, and a two-door hardtop and convertible only in the Crown level of trim. As a result, power windows were now standard on all Imperials. Imperial Crown coupes adopted the smaller style LeBaron "formal rear window" that had been introduced in 1960, and both body styles could now be ordered with a vinyl roof. A total of 23,295 Imperials were sold, making 1964 its second-best sales year. A padded dash, power seats, power steering, power brakes, and headrests were standard on the convertible and Crown Coupe. A new option this year was an adjustable steering wheel.

Tom McCahill, an automobile critic with a reputation for colorful metaphors, quipped that Imperial "cornered at speed flatter than a tournament billiard table", unusual for a car of its prodigious weight and extreme dimensions. McCahill had already become a loyal customer, buying a new Imperial yearly through 1962. His visible and enthusiastic endorsement helped Imperial forge a reputation as the "driver's car" among the big three luxury makes. McCahill observed in 1964:

This is what I told them in California. When I hit the road with hundreds of pounds of baggage, typewriters and testing equipment, I'm not out there just to have fun. I want to get from here to there, which may be thousands of miles away, with as much comfort as possible. Besides, Boji [his dog] now demands comfort. So does my wife.

I've been on some pretty fancy trains, including private cars, and to this writing, I have never found anything quite as comfortable or more capable of getting me to my destination as the '64 Imperial LeBaron. It's a great automobile.

1965 (Series AY1-M,H) 

Changes for 1965 were largely confined to the front fascia and to trim, and replacement of the push-button automatic transmission gear selection system with a more conventional steering column-mounted shift lever. The split grille was gone, replaced by a large chromed crossbar and surround, and the headlights were inset into the grill behind glass covers (similar to that year's Chrysler 300 and New Yorker models) with etched horizontal lines imitating the grill. As pointed out by the sales literature, 100-year-old Claro Walnut trim was added to the interior. Production totaled 18,409.

1966 (Series BY1-M,H) 
This was the final year for the Imperial platform that was first introduced in 1956 for the 1957 model year. All subsequent years through 1966 used this same basic platform with annual changes to the body sheetmetal. However, the Imperial still used the wrap-around windshield that had been dropped by most other makes for entry and exit room when they almost all simultaneously downsized for 1961.

The 1966 model year saw a change to an egg-crate grille. The glass headlight covers lost the etched lines but gained twin 24k gold bands around the perimeter. The trunk lid bulge became more squared off with a smaller Imperial script off to the side. The backup lights were moved to the lower bumper, nearly doubling taillight size. The Claro Walnut trim that had been introduced the previous year was used more extensively and would be replaced the following year. The  engine that had been standard since 1959 was replaced with a   engine.

Production totaled 13,752. There was a 1966 LeBaron that was presented to Pope Paul VI at the UN in New York for his use. Also this year, Imperial was the basis for "The Black Beauty," a rolling arsenal on the ABC-TV series The Green Hornet, starring Van Williams and Bruce Lee. A black Imperial of this year would also be restored as a wedding anniversary gift for Richard "The Old Man" Harrison who used to be on the History Channel show, Pawn Stars.

Third generation (1967–1968) 

Imperial styling was completely new for the 1967 and 1968 models. Using a two-inch shorter wheelbase, Imperial switched from the body-on-frame platform (D-body) to a unibody platform (C-body platform used in other full-size "Mopars".) While Imperial's front K member was  longer than a Chrysler's, dimensions behind the front fenders were similar. One reason for the change was that Chrysler had gained experience with unibody construction and was ready to apply it to the company's flagship line.

The economic component was that the switch to the C-body was less expensive than maintaining a separate platform for Imperial, which was increasingly difficult to justify given Imperial's relatively low sales volume. The new platform resulted in a significant reduction in weight as well as in exterior and interior dimensions. With the partnership gone between Ghia and Chrysler, limousines based on the Imperial were produced by Armbruster-Stageway of Fort Smith Arkansas. The limousines were "sectioned", with 36 inches added, most of that between the front and back doors with a few inches added between the rear door and the rear wheel, allowing room for two rear-facing seats with a small console/bar in between. The limousine conversions were longer than the earlier Ghia cars, and longer than the Cadillac Series 75 limousines.

1967 (Series CY1-M,H) 

Imperial shared the unibody platform with other full-sized Chrysler Corporation cars, but retained a unique bodyshell. The styling kept the overall straight-line, sharp-edged Engel theme, but there were many detail changes intended to make Imperial look less like Lincoln and more into its own territory. The spare tire bulge was completely gone from the rear, although the boss remained. The practically full-width taillights spread out from it, straight, but ended before chrome-tipped rear wings. A base Imperial model, simply called Imperial, returned for the first time since 1963, complementing the Crown and LeBaron levels of trim. It was the first four-door pillared Imperial sedan since 1960. New standard features included dual brakes with upfront discs and lane-change blinkers. Dual exhaust was no longer standard on the convertible. The only way to get it was to order the "TNT" version of the 440 engine, an option that promised more power.

An option on Crown coupes was the Mobile Director. Essentially the front passenger seat turned to face rearward and a small table and high-intensity light folded out over the back seat. The idea was that an "executive" could turn around and do work while being driven to the office, or he could sit behind the driver and a secretary could take dictation in the rear-facing front seat. The concept originated with the 1966 Mobile Executive Show Car that was an Imperial Coupe fitted with a telephone, Dictaphone, writing table, typewriter, television, reading lamp, and stereo. Chrysler also used the reversed front seat idea in the 300X show car. Costing $597.40 ($317.60 in 1968 ($ in  dollars )), at a time when a Crown coupe started at US$6,011, it was a very expensive option ($ in  dollars ). Thus a total of only 81 Crown coupes were ordered this way, and only a handful so equipped are known to still exist. The option was canceled at the end of the 1968 model year. Sales increased to 17,614.

1968 (Series DY1-M,H) 
The 1968 Imperial was little changed from the previous year. The grille changed to a brightly chromed one with thin horizontal bars, split in the middle by vertical chrome and a round Imperial Eagle badge. This badge replaced the stand-up hood ornament used on the 1967s.  The cornering lamp lenses were now covered by matching grilles. At the rear, the horizontal bars over the taillights remained, but the gas filler door pull was changed to a cast metal eagle instead of a round knob containing a plastic emblem. All 1968s came with a Federally mandated energy-absorbing steering column. The base-level model was canceled after only one year and the four-door sedan became part of the Crown level of trim. This was also the last year for the Imperial convertible. A total of 15,367 Imperials were sold in 1968.

Fourth generation (1969–1973) 

The "Fuselage Look" was how Chrysler described its new styling for 1969. Instead of the square lines of 1964-1968 models, the new Imperials featured rounded "tumblehome" sides, bulging at the beltline like an airliner’s "fuselage" and tucking in down to the rocker panels. The new styling made the cars look longer and wider, and strongly curved side glass increased shoulder room without expanding overall body width compared to the previous C-body.

To reduce development and tooling costs, and bring overall expenditures more in line with actual sales, Imperial began to share some of its bodyshell with the Chrysler New Yorker for the first time since 1956. Consequently, glass and roofs were common with the entry-level Chrysler Newport. In other respects, however, little had changed; construction was still unibody, the wheelbase was still stretched  longer than a Chrysler's in front of the passenger section, the engine and transmission were the same, and the torsion bar front suspension was still used.

1969 (Series EY-L,M) 
In keeping with the times, the look was sleeker, with a reduced, more subtle level of trim. For the first time, the lights were hidden behind doors, giving a fashionable at the time full-width grille look using "loop" bumpers. Only this year the Imperial featured sequential turn signals. 1969 was the final model year for pillared sedans, and it was also the first year for the Imperial LeBaron coupe. At , the Imperial once again became the longest non-limousine car made in America, and would remain so through 1973 when it would set the post-WW II record for non-limousine car length. A total of 22,083 were produced, making it Imperial's third-best ever year. Ambruster-Stageway of Fort Smith Arkansas continued with limousine conversions using the 1969-71 sheetmetal. Twelve conversions were delivered over the three years, including one for then New York governor Nelson Rockefeller.

1970 (Series FY-L,M) 
The 1970 models differed only in minor ways. The grill pattern changed to a larger egg-crate design; the front cornering lamps were rectangular instead of the "shark gill" pattern of 1969 models. A wide chrome strip was added at the rocker panels, vinyl side trim was made optional, and (for this year only) the fender skirts were gone. It was the final year for the Crown series and this was the first year the LeBaron out sold the Crown. Imperial had only two models and styles of Imperial for 1970. A LeBaron hardtop sedan and coupe and the Crown hardtop coupe and sedan. 11,816 of the 1970 Imperial's were produced.

1971 (Series GY-M)
For 1971, the Imperial Eagle at the front of the hood was gone, replaced by the word IMPERIAL; the decklid badge said, for the first time, "IMPERIAL by Chrysler" and the only model offered was the LeBaron. The 1971 Imperial is notable for being the first production car in America with a 4-wheel Anti-lock braking system (ABS) from Bendix, a rarely selected option at that time. A total of 11,569 1971 Imperials were produced with a retail price of US$6,276 for the sedan ($ in  dollars ).

Although the vinyl top was standard, for a short time a unique paisley-patterned vinyl top in a burgundy color was available as an option on burgundy-painted cars. It has been rumored that this top had actually been overprinted on waste "Mod Top" patterned vinyl, which had been available on some 1969 and 1970 model year Dodge and Plymouth cars, but according to Jeffrey Godshall, a Chrysler designer and frequent contributor to the magazine Collectible Automobile, this was not the case. With exposure to the elements, the burgundy overprint faded, and the pattern began to show through in a purple "paisley" pattern. Chrysler replaced many affected tops with either white or black standard vinyl, but some survive.

1972 (Series HY-M) 
Evolutionary styling was the basis for completely new sheetmetal for the 1972 model year, giving the cars a bigger and heavier all-around appearance. A somewhat more rounded side profile without a character line down the side and chrome trim on the top seams of the fenders from the rear windows forward appeared. The front fascia was all new and imposing-looking, and the rear featured vertical teardrop taillights for the first time, with side marker lights in the form of shields with eagles on them. Sales increased to 15,796. Two all-black LeBaron sedans were delivered to the US Secret Service, which then turned them over to Hess and Eisenhardt, which converted them into limos for Presidential use. Both cars were used as late as 1981, and carried Ronald Reagan and his staff to Capitol Hill for his presidential swearing-in ceremony in January 1981.

1973 (Series 3Y-M) 
The 1973 model year saw new federal bumper standards to prevent damage. The front bumper ends revived a Woodlite headlamp appearance which was a popular, extra cost item during the 1930s. As 1973 was in general a good year for the auto industry, 16,729 of the 1973 Imperials were built and sold.

Fifth generation (1974–1975) 

With future sales forecasts likely to remain low, Chrysler had planned on discontinuing the Imperial at the end of the 1973 model year. While image and appearance were an important part of luxury car appeal, without sales Chrysler could not afford to build an Imperial with a unique bodyshell. Yet without one, it would be difficult to compete with rivals Cadillac and Lincoln. For 1974, the Crown Coupe nameplate returned as the most expensive model to compete with the Cadillac Eldorado and the Continental Mark IV with a list price of $7,856 ($ in  dollars ).

A front-end design envisioned for the next Imperial penned by Chrysler/Imperial exterior studio senior stylist Chet Limbaugh came to the attention of Elwood Engel. It featured a "waterfall" grille with thin vertical chrome bars separated by a body-colored band running through the center, which started on top of the nose and flowed down.

Engel showed the design to Chrysler president John Riccardo and convinced him to use it on an Imperial. To save money the 1974 model would use the same body panels as the Chrysler New Yorker except for the front end clip and trunk lid. This meant that for the first time as a separate marque, the Imperial would share the same wheelbase as a production Chrysler.

An impact absorbing front bumper was also new.

1974 (Series 4Y-M) 

With the full effects of the 1973 oil crisis being solidly felt, a bad year for both the U.S. economy and its auto industry was in store for 1974 - cruel timing for Chrysler's 50th anniversary year. The 1974 Imperial was the first regular American passenger car to offer 4-wheel disc brakes since the 1949–1954 Chrysler Imperials, the 1950–1952 Crosleys and the 1965-on Chevrolet Corvettes. The "by Chrysler" script was removed from the car for 1974. The Imperial's electronic ignition system was a U.S. market first, as was the optional car alarm. In addition to the two regular LeBaron models, a 50th Anniversary 2-door LeBaron Crown Coupe was also produced. Finished in Golden Fawn, only 57 were built. While total sales were down from 1973, Chrysler was pleased with the 14,483 Imperials produced, given the poor economy in 1974 and a retail price of $7,230 for the sedan ($ in  dollars ).

1975 (Series 5Y-M) 

A bolder waterfall grille appeared in 1975, one of the few changes for the model year. The front bumper received slots to aid in engine cooling, and a few other detail improvements were made.

This was to be the last model year of the independent Imperial marque, with only 8,830 1975 models sold. The last Imperial, a black LeBaron hardtop, rolled out of the factory on 12 June 1975. However, only the name disappeared, as the same basic car was offered rather more cheaply, less some of the Imperial’s features, as the Chrysler New Yorker Brougham for model years 1976 through 1978.

With divisional cost-savings having forced the Imperial to share basically everything but some trim and badging with the Chrysler New Yorker (and the same platform as all Chryslers and full-sized Dodges and Plymouths), justifying the price differential over a high-end New Yorker had proven increasingly hard for prospective customers to do, given that the four-door hardtop was listed at $9,046 ($ in  dollars ). Compounding this the costs of maintaining and marketing a separate poorly selling marque became too high for the limited return, even at the expense of sacrificing Chrysler's most prestigious automobile.

Sixth generation (1981–1983) 

Hoping to revive not merely the brand, or the division, but all of Chrysler, the company recruited former top Ford executive Lee Iacocca for its helm.  He had proven successful in upscaling the 1967 Thunderbird into the 1969 Continental Mark III positioned on the highest end of the personal luxury car market, and sought to repeat a variant of the formula with the Imperial.  Only this time the car would be downsized and de-featured instead of the other way around.

Although Chrysler was facing bankruptcy, Iacocca argued that "a new flagship would assure the public that Chrysler had a future." However, when the car finally appeared, a 2-door coupé riding on an intermediate J platform, it was marketed simply as Imperial, and, harking to Imperial's days as an independent marque of the manufacturer, the Chrysler name did not even appear on the car.

There was no four door or full-sized option, the J-platform being shared the second generation Chrysler Cordoba and Dodge Mirada. The bustle-back appearance and prominent grille was an attempt to revive the 1930s and 1940s luxury car appearances that were briefly popular during the early 1980s, as with the second generation Cadillac Seville. Chrysler designers drew inspiration from the 1937–1939 Chrysler Imperial sedans.

The traditional Imperial eagle logo was not used, as it had been moved to the Chrysler LeBaron model in 1977. Instead, it bore a Chrysler Pentastar hood ornament made of Cartier crystal.

Competing models such as the Cadillac Eldorado and the Continental Mark VI had been downsized by 1981, so the Imperial was of comparable size to its competitors with a listed retail price of $18,311 ($ in  dollars ). A marketing effort for the new model included commercials and magazine ads featuring singer Frank Sinatra, a personal friend of Iacocca whom Sinatra jokingly referred to as "the other chairman of the board." Sinatra even recorded special songs to promote the new Imperial. In addition, Sinatra agreed to work for Chrysler for $1 a year because he believed that more performers should get involved in helping to save jobs in the United States (though his union later forced him to accept scale pay instead).

The Imperial's front suspension featured transverse-mounted torsion bars; the rear suspension included asymmetric multiple-leaf, "S"-shaped springs, anti-sway bar, and telescopic shock absorbers. Extensive use of rubber isolators contributed to the Imperial's virtually silent ride on top of Goodyear polyester steel-belted Arriva tires. The Imperials carried a market-leading 24-month/30,000-mile limited warranty which covered all labor, maintenance, and parts (except tires).

For the new Imperial, a special quality-assurance center had been built adjacent to the Windsor plant where the car was assembled. Here, after assembly, each individual Imperial, which had already been subjected to countless inspections, was then given additional examinations. After an underbody fluid-leak inspection utilizing a high-pressure water spray, the car was checked for front-end alignment and given a 5.5-mile road test over a special track that included various types of terrain. At each inspection step, the Imperial received a sign-off if everything was in order.

"Imperial is a special car for a special owner," said Tom Pappert, Chrysler's Vice President of U.S. Automotive Sales. "It is designed to appeal to the personal luxury car buyer seeking the highest level of prestige, advanced styling, engineering and special features, extended warranty, and VIP recognition in both the showroom and service areas."

1981 
The 1981 Imperial came with a long list of standard features including air conditioning with thermostatic temperature control, electronic fuel injection, power windows, power door locks, power seats, power outside mirrors, power trunk release, tilt steering column, automatic speed control, garage door opener, and other conveniences. Options included a cost-free choice of wheels (color-coordinated 'snowflake' cast-aluminum wheels or steel wire wheel covers), upholstery choices including Mark Cross leather (see below) and Yorkshire cloth, sound systems choice, 40-band CB radio, power moon roof, and the Frank Sinatra Edition package (see below).

Unique for the Imperial was the first fully electronic digital instrumentation ever provided in a production-built American automobile. The Imperial's electronic information center was manufactured at Chrysler's Huntsville, Alabama Electronics Division, which was also a prime contractor in America's Redstone and Saturn Apollo space programs. Located in the center of the instrument panel were nine push-buttons the driver was to touch to operate Imperial's information center. The buttons were: 1) Mode-U.S./Met. A touch converts the reading on the speedometer, odometer and fuel displays to metric; 2) Clock-Date.; 3) Clock-E.T.; 4) Odometer-Trip.; 5) Odometer-Avg. Speed.; 6) Fuel-Range.; 7) Fuel-Present.; 8) Fuel-Trip.; 9) Reset-Zero. The instrument panel displayed an electronic blue-green VFD readout which also featured gear selection.

The Imperial for this year offered a choice of eleven exterior colors (Sterling Silver Crystal Coat; Day Star Blue Crystal Coat; Nightwatch Blue; Light Auburn Crystal Coat; Mahogany StarMist; Light Seaspray Green Crystal Coat; Spice Tan Starmist; Manila Cream; Morocco Red; Pearl White; Formal Black), and six cloth and seven leather interior colors (Dark Blue; Green; Red; Mahogany; Heather; Cashmere; White for leather only). In all, thirty-five interior color and trim combinations were available.

1982 
The Imperial continued to offer an extensive list of standard luxury and convenience items for 1982 although some changes were made. Imperial's "floating cushion" velour seats were replaced with ones of Kimberly velvet one-piece construction. New "Quartz-Lock" electronically tuned radios (ETR) were added to the options list while the power moonroof was no longer available.

1983 
Following significant price increases during the 1981 and 1982 model years, due in part to high inflation at the time, the Imperial's base price was cut back close to its original introductory level. The hood ornament, while similar in appearance, was changed from Cartier crystal to plastic. The Frank Sinatra Edition package was no longer available. A suspension upgrade Touring Edition package was added.

Overall, the sixth generation Imperial did not meet Chrysler management's sales and reliability expectations. It had innovations such as the fuel injection system and electronic instrument cluster, and Chrysler tried to use it as a showcase for technology and quality. Unfortunately the fuel injection system proved troublesome and many 1981 models were retrofitted under warranty (or later on owner initiative) with carburetors.

The Imperial name would reappear in 1990, but as the flagship sub-brand Chrysler Imperial model.

Powertrain 
The  V8, was the only available engine. 1981 models came standard with a Chrysler-built throttle-body EFI system, replaced by a carburetor for 1982 and 1983 models. The automatic transmission was a wide-ratio TorqueFlite equipped with lock-up torque converter, with the final drive ratio 2.2:1 in 1981 and 1983; 2.4:1 in 1982.

Special trims

Frank Sinatra (fs) Edition 

The Imperial had an unusual distinction for 1981 and 1982 as it was offered with an optional special edition named after a celebrity. The Imperial fs was a rare example of automotive history, as it was one of only a handful of regular production cars bearing a celebrity's name. This limited edition Imperial was available only in Glacier Blue Crystal paint - Chrysler advertising claimed it matched the color of Sinatra's eyes - and had special "fs" (lowercase) external badging, with a large glovebox placard proclaiming "Frank Sinatra Signature Edition". Inside, 16 cassette tapes of Sinatra titles were presented in a specially made Mark Cross leather case which were stored in a special locking console below the dashboard. 148 1981 and 279 1982 fs edition cars were manufactured and cost $1,078 ($ in  dollars ) above the normal sticker price of $20,988 ($ in  dollars ).

Limousine 
Aside from the fs edition available for purchase by the public, Chrysler president Lee Iacocca commissioned a 1982 Imperial converted by ASC (American Sunroof Corporation) outside Detroit, Michigan, using the front doors from a 1979-81 Chrysler Fifth Avenue sedan into a limousine with a  stretch, and presented it to Frank Sinatra as a gift. A similar Imperial limousine also built by ASC is also used in the 1984 movie Cannonball Run II driven by Burt Reynolds and Dom DeLuise, as well as the movies Sharky's Machine and Stick both directed by and starring Reynolds.

Cartier Crystals 
All 1981 to 1983 model year Imperials had Cartier crystals strategically placed on the exterior opera lights and steering wheel, and each crystal displayed 'Cartier.' In addition, each Imperial came with a Cartier crystal key in the Mark Cross Gift Set.

Mark Cross Interior & Gift Set 
All 1981 to 1983 model year Imperials had the interior designed by Mark Cross, maker of fine leather goods. The seating came in either Kimberly cloth or Leather. Upon purchasing a new Imperial, Chrysler shipped the new owner a Mark Cross Gift Set consisting of an umbrella, leather portfolio, leather key fob, uncut Cartier key, and a 'Sounds of Stereo' music cassette. These were exclusive Mark Cross items not available for sale in a Mark Cross showroom.

NASCAR 
A few race teams built NASCAR spec racecars with Imperial sheetmetal and raced them on the NASCAR circuit from 1981 through the 1985 season, though mostly only on the superspeedways. They were driven by Buddy Arrington, Rick Baldwin, Cecil Gordon, Phil Goode, and Maurice Randall. The cars did not distinguish themselves to any great degree, however a Buddy Arrington owned and driven Imperial finished in sixth place in the summer 1982 race at Michigan International Speedway in Brooklyn. The Imperial-based cars were used in competition as it was determined to be far more aerodynamic (and capable of higher speeds) than the Dodge Mirada at the time. The car had a drag coefficient of 0.41, which was better than contemporary Corvette (0.45), and performed well on the big high speed tracks, with Morgan Shepherd (driving Buddy Arrington's Imperial) qualifying for the 1985 Daytona 500 at a speed of 197 mph, despite the lack of suitable high-performance race engines. One of Arrington's Imperials is in the Talladega, Alabama NASCAR museum.

Production figures 
The first 1981 Imperial rolled off the assembly line on August 11, 1980. Imperial production ended on April 29, 1983. Chrysler had originally planned to cap production at 25,000 units.

*Cars manufactured in 1980 calendar year were sold as 1981 model year.

Imperial limousines

Imperial Crown (1955–1965) 

For 1955 and 1956, an Imperial Crown limousine model was also offered. A total of 172 were built for (model year) 1955, with 226 for 1956. They were the last Chrysler-branded limousines built entirely in Detroit. Color choices were limited to dark green, dark blue, maroon or black with wire wheels being the only optional equipment offered.

From 1957 through 1965, long-wheelbase Imperial Crown cars would be finished by Ghia in Italy and was formally introduced January 2, 1957. Later models were built from four-door models to the same specification. Each took a month to build and carried a high price for the time of US$18,500 in 1963-64 ($ in  dollars ). They sold in limited numbers against the Cadillac Series 75 that was less expensive at US$9724–$9960 in 1963-64 ($ in  dollars ), and had an established reputation among limousine buyers, as well as against competing coachbuilders building on the Cadillac commercial chassis. Packard had ended production in 1957 and both the Mercedes-Benz 300d and the Rolls-Royce Silver Cloud had just been introduced. A total of 132 Imperial Crowns were manufactured for Chrysler by Ghia over 1957-65. An oddity is that these cars were often built as soon as the styling changed, and sold over a period of some years. All 1961 Imperial Crown Ghias used the 1960 styling front and rear, for example, and all 10 Ghia built Imperial Crowns sold during the 1965 model year were 1964s with 1965 exterior styling and consequently had a TorqueFlight pushbutton gear selector. At about  curb weight the 1957-65 Ghia built Imperial Crowns are the heaviest standard production cars sold by an American firm since the 1930s.
 
Throughout her husband's term as U.S. President, Jacqueline Kennedy's personal car was a Ghia built 1961 Imperial Crown with 1960 model year styling. The car figured prominently in her various duties as First Lady. In President John F. Kennedy's funeral procession on November 25, 1963, near the front of the motorcade, carrying Jackie and her children, was her Imperial Crown.

New York governor and heir to the Standard Oil fortune Nelson Rockefeller, later Vice President of the U.S. during the term of President Gerald Ford, also owned a 1960 Imperial Crown. It is one of 17 limousines made by Ghia in that year, and the only one with blind rear quarter treatment.

In the 1974 movie The Godfather Part II, a black Ghia built 1958 Imperial Crown was used by Michael Corleone (played by Al Pacino) while at the family compound near Reno, Nevada.

Imperial Crown (1967–1971) and Imperial (through 1983) 

While the "Imperial Crown" limousines ended in 1965, Imperial limousines continued to be made by other coachbuilders. After the last ten Ghia-built Imperial Crowns were completed, Ghia sold its tooling to Barreiros Coachbuilders of Spain. Barreiros built ten limousines, much like those built by Ghia and, similar to the last ten built by Ghia, built as 1965s with 1966 exterior styling, but with a wheelbase two inches longer. Build quality was poor by comparison, with the cars famous for having a wiring harness made from wires of the same color. This effort was made with Chrysler's cooperation, but Chrysler did not advertise them as official Crown Imperials; that model was not offered by the factory in 1966.

For the model years 1967 through 1971, a total of 27 Imperial limousines were produced by Stageway Coachbuilders (ASC) of Fort Smith, Arkansas on a  wheelbase, and were justifiably advertised as the largest luxury automobiles in the world. These were the official Imperial Crown models. Armbruster-Stageway was a well-established builder of such customized products as airport limousines, and Chrysler had been collaborating with the firm for years. The last of these was built in 1969, though leftover units were updated with 1970 and 1971 grilles and taillights, and sold during those model years. They closed out the Imperial Custom /Imperial Crown tradition in fine style.

Two 1972 models with 1973 model year grilles were built by the Hess and Eisenhardt Company of Fairfield, Ohio for the United States Secret Service and were used by Presidents Nixon, Ford, Carter, and finally Reagan on his swearing-in day. One 1974 model year Imperial was produced into a limo also by ASC.

Imperial Crown limousines should not be confused with the Imperial Crown and Crown Coupe models. The Crown Imperial Limousine was the top of the line, and fitted with LeBaron trim or better, while the Imperial Crown was the middle-tier line through 1968 and bottom of the Imperial line in 1969 and 1970.

Imperial Advertising Slogans
"America's Most Carefully Built Car"
"The Finest Car America Has Yet Produced"
"Finest Product of Chrysler Corporation"
"The Incomparable Imperial"
"Excellence Without Equal" 
"It's Time for Imperial" (1981–1983)

See also 
 Chrysler Imperial

References

External links 

 Online Imperial Club
 Fuselage bodies at Allpar.com
 J-bodies at Allpar.com
 1969 - 1973 Imperials at Fuselage.de site
 Imperials listed by model and chassis in movies and TV series
 Imperial-Chrysler Corporation's Finest Cars

Imperial vehicles
1960s cars
1970s cars
Rear-wheel-drive vehicles
Full-size vehicles
Luxury vehicles
Coupés
Sedans
Convertibles
Cars introduced in 1955
Defunct motor vehicle manufacturers of the United States
Motor vehicle manufacturers based in Michigan
Personal luxury cars
Luxury motor vehicle manufacturers